Lawson's Pond Plantation is a historic plantation house located near Cross, Berkeley County, South Carolina. It was built about 1823, and is a large two-story clapboard structure set upon high foundations.  It has a hipped roof and features a one-story piazza along the front and left facades.

It was listed in the National Register of Historic Places in 1977.

References

External links

Historic American Buildings Survey in South Carolina
Houses on the National Register of Historic Places in South Carolina
Houses completed in 1823
Houses in Berkeley County, South Carolina
National Register of Historic Places in Berkeley County, South Carolina
Plantations in South Carolina
Plantation houses in South Carolina